James Vaughan was Dean of Achonry from 1662 to 1683.

References

17th-century English Anglican priests
Deans of Achonry
Year of birth missing
Year of death missing